Sajan Singh (born 24 April 1932) is an Indian wrestler. He competed in the men's freestyle light heavyweight at the 1960 Summer Olympics.

References

External links
 

1932 births
Living people
Indian male sport wrestlers
Olympic wrestlers of India
Wrestlers at the 1960 Summer Olympics
People from Mahendragarh district
Asian Games medalists in wrestling
Wrestlers at the 1962 Asian Games
Wrestlers at the 1966 Asian Games
Asian Games silver medalists for India
Asian Games bronze medalists for India
Medalists at the 1962 Asian Games
Medalists at the 1966 Asian Games
Commonwealth Games medallists in wrestling
Commonwealth Games silver medallists for India
Wrestlers at the 1970 British Commonwealth Games
Medallists at the 1970 British Commonwealth Games